Fumarylacetoacetic acid (fumarylacetoacetate) is an intermediate in the metabolism of tyrosine.  It is formed through the conversion of maleylacetoacetate into fumarylacetoacetate by the enzyme maleylacetoacetate isomerase.

See also
 Fumarylacetoacetate hydrolase

References

Dicarboxylic acids
Beta-keto acids
Enones